Silva Iaponicarum is a quarterly open access academic journal covering Japanese studies and published in Polish, English, and Japanese by Japanese studies institutions in Poland. Its first issue was released in September 2004. The editor-in-chief is Arkadiusz Jabłoński (Department of Japanese Studies, Adam Mickiewicz University in Poznań).

External links 
 
 

Japanese studies journals
Quarterly journals